New Bremen High School is a public high school in New Bremen, Ohio.  Located in Auglaize County, it is the only high school in the New Bremen Local Schools district.  Their nickname is the Cardinals and their colors are crimson and gold.  They are a member of the Midwest Athletic Conference.

Athletics
The Cardinals are a member of the strong Midwest Athletic Conference.

Ohio High School Athletic Association State Championships
Girls Volleyball – 2017, 2019, 2022
Boys Football – 2020, 2022

Notes and references

External links
District Website

High schools in Auglaize County, Ohio
Public high schools in Ohio